The Basketligaen Defender of the Year is an annual basketball award that is given by the Danish top tier Basketligaen. It is awarded to the best defensive player in a given regular season. The award was introduced in the 2010–11 season. Michel Diouf holds the record for most awards won.

Winners

References

European basketball awards
Basketligaen